Victoria Park is a public park located just to the north of Portsmouth Guildhall, adjacent to Portsmouth and Southsea railway station and close to the city centre in Portsmouth, Hampshire. It was officially opened on 25 May 1878 and was the first public park to be opened in Portsmouth. It was designed by Alexander McKenzie. The centre of the park features an enclosed area which inhabits animals such as birds, rabbits and guinea pigs.

The park is also home to a number of monuments. These mostly consist of obelisks but there is also one in the style of a Chinese temple in memorial of HMS Orlando.

References

External links

Portsmouth Victoria Park details
Official Website

Urban public parks
Portsmouth
Parks and open spaces in Hampshire
Tourist attractions in Portsmouth